Arraiján   is a city and corregimiento in Arraiján District, Panamá Oeste Province, Panama with a population of 41,041 as of 2010. It is the seat of Arraiján District. Its population as of 1990 was 24,665; its population as of 2000 was 64,772.

References

Corregimientos of Panamá Oeste Province
Populated places in Panamá Oeste Province